Jatco SC (ジヤトコサッカー部) was a Japanese football club based in Numazu, Shizuoka. The club had played in Japan Football League.

Club name
1972-1999; Jatco
2000-2001; Jatco TT
2002-2003; Jatco

External links
Football of Japan

1972 establishments in Japan
2003 disestablishments in Japan
Defunct football clubs in Japan
Japan Football League (1992–1998) clubs
Japan Football League clubs
Sports teams in Shizuoka Prefecture
Association football clubs established in 1972
Association football clubs disestablished in 2003
Works association football clubs in Japan